Boris Cepeda (born September 26, 1974, in Quito) is a German-Ecuadorian Pianist and Diplomat.

Biography 

Boris Cepeda got his first piano lessons at four. He appeared in public for the first time in Ecuadorian television at five. 
Since then he has performed worldwide. 
Boris Cepeda studied at the University of the Arts Bremen in the class of Kurt Seibert.
In 1999 he became assistant manager to the artistic director of the Festival Weidener Max-Reger-Tage
From 2002 to 2007 he acted as Cultural attaché at the Embassy of Ecuador in Berlin.
Since 2016 he is Head of Music at the Municipal Theater of Münster
2019 he was appointed lecturer for score reading at the Robert Schumann University of Music in Düsseldorf.

Awards

2022 Fellowship for innovation in digital higher education teaching

2021 Steinway Artist

References

External links 
 official Website

German classical pianists
Male classical pianists
1974 births
Living people
Ecuadorian musicians
21st-century classical pianists
21st-century male musicians